Mario Gutiérrez Cotelo (born 10 February 1975) is a Spanish retired professional footballer who played as a right midfielder.

He amassed La Liga totals of 168 games and six goals over the course of ten seasons, representing in the competition Sporting de Gijón, Sevilla and Getafe.

Club career
Born in La Felguera, Asturias, Cotelo began his career at local Sporting de Gijón, and played for their reserves during his first two seasons as a senior. In 1993–94 he appeared once for the main squad and, after a loan to Segunda División side CD Badajoz, would become an important player with the latter.

After four full seasons with Gijón, Cotelo returned to La Liga with Sevilla FC, but would only appear five times for the Andalusians over one and a half campaigns, moving to UD Las Palmas in January 2003. In 2003–04 he was a key element in Getafe CF's first-ever promotion to the top flight, and went on to appear in a combined 93 league games the following three years.

Used sparingly throughout 2007–08, Cotelo also played six incomplete UEFA Cup matches in the Madrid side's quarter-final run. In the next season he featured even less (five minutes of action), and was subsequently released.

Not being able to find a new club, Cotelo retired from the game in early 2010, at the age of 35. He totalled 349 appearances in the country's two major divisions.

On 20 August 2015, Cotelo returned to Sporting to work as a match delegate.

References

External links

1975 births
Living people
People from Langreo
Spanish footballers
Footballers from Asturias
Association football midfielders
La Liga players
Segunda División players
Segunda División B players
Sporting de Gijón B players
Sporting de Gijón players
CD Badajoz players
Sevilla FC players
UD Las Palmas players
Getafe CF footballers